BBC Cymru Wales New Broadcasting House, previously known as the BBC Cymru Wales Headquarters building, is the headquarters of BBC Cymru Wales in Central Square, Cardiff. It operates many of its broadcasting services (radio and TV) from there using IP-based studios. It also serves as a base for S4C.

The £120 million building replaced the BBC Cymru Wales Broadcasting House in Llandaff, when 1,000 production and support staff began moving into the new facility in October 2019. The building is officially located at 3 Central Square, but has also been referred to as BBC New Broadcasting House.

Operation 

The building's first live transmission was made on 14 July 2020 by continuity announcer Tim Cooper on BBC Two Wales. Continuity announcer Leanne Thomas introduced the Six O'clock news on BBC One Wales for the first time on 15 July.

This was followed by the first radio broadcasts - by BBC Radio Cymru 2 host Daniel Glyn on 25 July and BBC Radio Wales host Owen Money on 31 July.

TV news programmes including Wales Today for BBC One Wales and Newyddion for S4C transferred from Llandaff to Central Square in September 2020, with viewers seeing the building's roof garden in a live broadcast by reporter Alex Jennings on an afternoon broadcast of Wales Today.

On 27 January 2021, S4C moved its TV and online operations from Parc Tŷ Glas, in Llanishen, Cardiff to Central Square from where the channel now broadcasts. Under a partnership agreement, BBC Wales provides S4C's playout and other technology services.

The building has achieved the BREEAM "Outstanding" rating, which was first introduced in August 2008 to recognise a new standard of sustainability for exemplary buildings. The building will also be the first BBC building to use live IP (internet protocol) technology, it also has augmented reality, virtual reality and robotic cameras.

Design and construction
Construction started in December 2015 on the site of the former Cardiff Central bus station. The building is half the size of the former Broadcasting House in Llandaff. The BBC received the keys to the building in April 2018, after which the headquarters was fitted out with new technology before staff moved in, around October 2019.

The building has been designed by Foster + Partners, with the interior design by Overbury and Sheppard Robson. There will be four floors providing office, studio and production space. There will be desk space for 750 staff, on the basis that not all the 1,200 staff will be on site at the same time.

It is envisaged that an estimated 50,000 people will visit the new building every year. The BBC agreed a 20-year lease on the building at an annual rent of around £25 per square foot per annum with Rightacres Property Company, the developer of the Central Square.

See also
 Media in Cardiff
 Architecture of Cardiff

Notes

External links
 
 BBC Cymru Wales Headquarters on the Foster + Partners website
 centralsquarecardiff.co.uk

BBC offices, studios and buildings
Television in Wales
Buildings and structures in Cardiff
BBC Cymru Wales
Office buildings in Cardiff
Foster and Partners buildings